"For My Baby" is a song by Full Flava featuring CeCe Peniston, written and produced by Rob Derbyshire and Paul "Solomon" Mullings. Dance remixes of the composition were based on a sample of "Heartache No. 9", the Delegation hit single, which scored at number fifty-seven in US Dance and number sixty-six on US R&B chart.

The composition was recorded for the Full Flava's second studio album Colour of My Soul on Dôme Records, that included eleven solo songs performed by several female vocalists (Carleen Anderson, Donna Odain, Beverlei Brown, Hazel Fernandes, Romina Johnson, Alison Limerick, CeCe Peniston, and Donna Gardier).

Peniston's record was released in England as the third cut taken from Full Flava's studio set, and it was given house mixes from Dave "Leggz" Longmore and Sam Junior Bromfield, both responsible for their UK Garage production outfit known as Ruff N Tumble, and the Midlands duo KT & C.

Credits and personnel
 CeCe Peniston – lead vocal
 Tee – back vocal
 Ika – writer, back vocal
 Rob Derbyshire – writer, producer
 Paul Mullings  – writer, producer
 KT & C – remix, additional producer
 Dave Longmore  – remix, additional producer
 Sam Junior Bromfield  – remix, additional producer

Track listings and formats

 12", UK, #12 DOME 179
 "For My Baby" (Ruff N Tumble Vocal Remix)
 "For My Baby" (KT & C Remix)
 "For My Baby" (Ruff N Tumble Dub)

 CD, UK, #CD DOME 179
 "For My Baby" (Radio Edit) - 3:55
 "For My Baby" (Ruff N Tumble Remix) - 6:25
 "For My Baby" (KT & C Remix) - 6:40

See also
 Electronic dance music
 List of artists who reached number one on the US Dance chart

References

General

 Specific

External links 
 
 

2003 singles
CeCe Peniston songs
2003 songs